Contectopalatus was a primitive ichthyosaur, an extinct fish-like marine reptile from the Middle Triassic of Germany and China. It was originally named Ichthyosaurus atavus (Quenstedt, 1851/52), and later Mixosaurus atavus (Quenstedt 1852). It was recognised as a valid genus by Maisch and Matzke in 1998, though other authorities argue that it is synonymous with Mixosaurus.

See also

 List of ichthyosaurs
 Timeline of ichthyosaur research

References

Middle Triassic ichthyosaurs
Ichthyosaurs of Europe
Ichthyosauromorph genera